The Women's 50 metre butterfly competition at the 2017 World Championships was held on 28 and 29 July 2017.

Records
Prior to the competition, the existing world and championship records were as follows.

The following new records were set during this competition.

Results

Heats
The heats were held on 28 July at 09:56.

Semifinals
The semifinals were held on 28 July at 18:46.

Semifinal 1

Semifinal 2

Final
The final was held on 29 July at 17:32.

References

Women's 50 metre butterfly
2017 in women's swimming